A rash is a change of the human skin which affects its color, appearance, or texture.

A rash may be localized in one part of the body, or affect all the skin. Rashes may cause the skin to change color, itch, become warm, bumpy, chapped, dry, cracked or blistered, swell, and may be painful.
The causes, and therefore treatments for rashes, vary widely. Diagnosis must take into account such things as the appearance of the rash, other symptoms, what the patient may have been exposed to, occupation, and occurrence in family members. The diagnosis may confirm any number of conditions.
The presence of a rash may aid diagnosis; associated signs and symptoms are diagnostic of certain diseases. For example, the rash in measles is an erythematous, morbilliform, maculopapular rash that begins a few days after the fever starts. It classically starts at the head, and spreads downwards.

Differential diagnosis 
Common causes of rashes include:
 Food allergy
 Medication side effects
 Anxiety
 Allergies, for example to food, dyes, medicines, insect stings, metals such as zinc or nickel; such rashes are often called hives.
 Skin contact with an irritant
 Fungal infection, such as ringworm
 Balsam of Peru
 Reaction to vaccination
 Skin diseases such as eczema or acne
 Exposure to sun (sunburn) or heat
 Friction due to chafing of the skin
 Irritation such as caused by abrasives impregnated in clothing rubbing the skin. The cloth itself may be abrasive enough for some people
 Secondary syphilis
 Poor personal hygiene
Uncommon causes:
 Autoimmune disorders such as psoriasis
 Lead poisoning
 Pregnancy
 Repeated scratching on a particular spot
 Lyme disease
 Scarlet fever
COVID-19 (see )

Conditions

Diagnostic approach

The causes of a rash are numerous, which may make the evaluation of a rash extremely difficult. An accurate evaluation by a provider may only be made in the context of a thorough history, i.e. medications the patient is taking, the patient's occupation, where the patient has been and complete physical examination.

Points typically noted in the examination include:

 The appearance: e.g., purpuric (typical of vasculitis and meningococcal disease), fine and like sandpaper (typical of scarlet fever); circular lesions with a central depression are typical of molluscum contagiosum (and in the past, small pox); plaques with silver scales are typical of psoriasis.
 The distribution: e.g., the rash of scarlet fever becomes confluent and forms bright red lines in the skin creases of the neck, armpits and groins (Pastia's lines); the vesicles of chicken pox seem to follow the hollows of the body (they are more prominent along the depression of the spine on the back and in the hollows of both shoulder blades); very few rashes affect the palms of the hands and soles of the feet (secondary syphilis, rickettsia or spotted fevers, guttate psoriasis, hand, foot and mouth disease, keratoderma blennorrhagicum);
 Symmetry: e.g., herpes zoster usually only affects one side of the body and does not cross the midline.

A patch test may be ordered, for diagnostic purposes.

Treatment

Treatment differs according to which rash a patient has been diagnosed with. Common rashes can be easily remedied using steroid topical creams (such as hydrocortisone) or non-steroidal treatments. Many of the medications are available over the counter in the United States.

The problem with steroid topical creams i.e. hydrocortisone; is their inability to penetrate the skin through absorption and therefore not be effective in clearing up the affected area, thus rendering the hydrocortisone almost completely ineffective in all except the most mild of cases.

References

External links 

Guide to rashes on Medline Plus Medical Encyclopedia – includes photographs
 Links to pictures of skin rashes (Hardin MD/Univ of Iowa)
 Pictures of common skin rashes compared (Dermapics)

Symptoms and signs: Skin and subcutaneous tissue
Dermatologic terminology